The Moss Point School District is a public school district based in Moss Point, Mississippi (USA). The district serves the communities of Moss Point, most of Escatawpa and all of Helena.

In early 2015, the district added sexual orientation, gender identity and gender expression to its protected civil rights and equal education opportunity policy and paid an undisclosed sum to settle a lawsuit by a student who was allegedly bullied by teachers and staff for her sexual orientation.

Schools

High School (Grades 9-12)
Moss Point High School

Middle School (Grades 6-8)
Magnolia Middle School

Elementary Schools (Grades K-5)
Escatawpa Upper Elementary School(Grades 3-5)
Kreole Primary School(Grades K-2)

Other District Campuses (Grades K-50)
Family Education Center
Moss Point Alternative Learning Center

History 
Prior to integration, Moss Point High School served the white students of the city, and Magnolia High School served the black students. When the schools were integrated in 1970, all high school students attended Moss Point High School; the former Magnolia High School was repurposed as a junior high school. The Moss Point High School building, whose main building was built in 1942, still serves the community today. 

Magnolia Junior High School served as one of the district's two junior high schools until 2003. That year, Ed Mayo Junior High and Magnolia Junior High merged into one school housed at the Magnolia campus. In 2005, Hurricane Katrina severely damaged the Magnolia building; junior high classes were temporarily moved to the former Ed Mayo building. Years later, the school district received FEMA funding to demolish and rebuild this historic school. Opening in 2013 on the site of the old school, the new Magnolia Middle School serves grades 6-8 and was built with materials salvaged from the old building. The new school has a room dedicated to the history of the old Magnolia school.

Demographics

2022-23 school year
There were a total of 1,569 students enrolled in the Moss Point School District during the 2022-23 school year. The gender makeup of the district was 47% female and 53% male. The racial makeup of the district was 73% African American, 15% White, less than 5% Hispanic, less than 5% Asian, and less than 5% Native American.

Previous school years

Mississippi Succeeds Report Card

Notable alumni
 Brad Arnold, 3 Doors Down leader singer
 Damarius Bilbo, NFL player and sports agent
 Devin Booker, NBA player
 Melvin Booker, NBA player
 Kenny Johnson, NFL player
 Tony Sipp, MLB player

Athletics

Football 
State Playoff Champions: 1983, 1991, 1996, 1997, 2000

District Championships: 1983, 1985, 1986, 1989, 1991, 1992, 1994, 1995, 1996, 1997, 2000, 2001, 2002, 2007, 2009, 2019, 2020, 2021

See also
List of school districts in Mississippi

References

External links
 

Education in Jackson County, Mississippi
School districts in Mississippi